Marques Allen Murrell (born March 20, 1985) is a former American football linebacker. He was signed by the Philadelphia Eagles as an undrafted free agent in 2007. He played college football at Appalachian State.

Murrell also played for the New York Jets, New England Patriots, Virginia Destroyers and Montreal Alouettes. He is the younger brother of former National Football League running back Adrian Murrell, who played with the Jets from 1993 to 1997.

Early years
Murrell registered 21 sacks over his final two seasons at Jack Britt High School in Fayetteville, North Carolina, to earn All-Region honors.

College career
Murrell was a two-time first-team All-American performer at Appalachian State University, finishing his career with 36 sacks and a school-record 18 forced fumbles. Murrell gained 13 sacks in both his junior and senior seasons, fueling his Appalachian State to two consecutive Division I-AA National Championships in 2005 and 2006. In the 2005 title game he forced a fumble that was returned by Jason Hunter for the winning touchdown in a 21–16 victory over University of Northern Iowa.

Professional career

Philadelphia Eagles
Murrell was signed by the Philadelphia Eagles as an undrafted free agent on May 14, 2007, following the 2007 NFL Draft. He was waived by the Eagles during final cuts on September 1, 2007, and was re-signed to the team's practice squad two days later.

New York Jets
Murrell was signed off the Eagles' practice squad by the New York Jets on November 7, 2007. Murrell played in four of the Jets' final seven games of the season, but did not record any stats. In 2008, Murrell made the Jets' 53-man roster and played in 12 games as a reserve, recording nine tackles.

In 16-13 overtime loss to the Buffalo Bills on October 18, 2009, Murrell and Jets safety James Ihedigbo threw punches at Bills tight end Derek Fine, prompting Murrell to be fined by the NFL for $5,000 and be benched, along with Ihedigbo, by head coach Rex Ryan for the following game against the Oakland Raiders on October 25, 2009. Murrell finished the 2009 season with 12 tackles in ten games played.

He was not tendered by the Jets as a restricted free agent following the season and became an unrestricted free agent.

New England Patriots
Murrell signed with the New England Patriots on March 9, 2010. He was released on September 13 after playing in the Patriots' season opener against the Cincinnati Bengals. The Patriots re-signed Murrell on January 5, 2011, prior to their first playoff game. He was waived on August 30.

Montreal Alouettes
On May 7, 2012, Murrell signed a two-year contract with the Montreal Alouettes of the Canadian Football League.

References

External links
Just Sports Stats
New England Patriots bio
New York Jets bio
Philadelphia Eagles bio

1985 births
Living people
Sportspeople from Fayetteville, North Carolina
Players of American football from North Carolina
American football defensive ends
American football linebackers
Appalachian State Mountaineers football players
Philadelphia Eagles players
New York Jets players
New England Patriots players
Virginia Destroyers players